Kåfjorden is a fjord in Nordkapp Municipality in Troms og Finnmark county, Norway. The fjord flows out into the Magerøysundet strait and then into the Porsangerfjorden. The European route E69 highway follows the southern coast of the fjord, and the entrance to the North Cape Tunnel lies on the western coast of the fjord.

See also
 List of Norwegian fjords

References

Fjords of Troms og Finnmark
Nordkapp